Butrointsi Point (‘Nos Butrointsi’ \'nos bu-'tro-in-tsi\) is the ice-free tipped point on the southeast side of the entrance to Kotev Cove on the northeast coast of Two Hummock Island in the Palmer Archipelago, Antarctica.

The point is named after the settlement of Butrointsi in Western Bulgaria.

Location
British mapping in 1978.

Maps
 British Antarctic Territory.  Scale 1:200000 topographic map.  DOS 610 Series, Sheet W 64 60.  Directorate of Overseas Surveys, UK, 1978.
 Antarctic Digital Database (ADD). Scale 1:250000 topographic map of Antarctica. Scientific Committee on Antarctic Research (SCAR), 1993–2016.

References
 Bulgarian Antarctic Gazetteer. Antarctic Place-names Commission. (details in Bulgarian, basic data in English)
 Butrointsi Point. SCAR Composite Antarctic Gazetteer.

External links
 Butrointsi Point. Copernix satellite image

Two Hummock Island
Headlands of the Palmer Archipelago
Bulgaria and the Antarctic